Liwa Jund al-Haramain is a Syrian rebel group aligned with the Syrian Democratic Forces, and part of the Manbij Military Council and SDF-member group Northern Sun Battalion.

Background
The group was formed in 2012 in Manbij and operated in Aleppo's countryside between Manbij and Jarabulus. The group fought against the Syrian government and later came into conflict with the Islamic State of Iraq and the Levant. The group also took part in the Battle of Aleppo, and was allied with the rebel Army of Mujahideen.

History
On 22 July 2013, the commander of Liwa Jund al-Haramain's 19th Brigade was killed in Khan al-Assal, while fighting pro-government forces in the city.

On 17 November 2013, Liwa Jund al-Haramain clashed with ISIL, Liwa Ahrar Souriya and Daraa al-Jazeera, as well as another faction believed to be associated with ISIL after days of tensions in Manbij, between Liwa Jund al-Haramain and other factions in the city. The group's headquarters were stormed by ISIL and allied opposition groups, and a drive-by type shooting also occurred at their headquarters. The clashes came after Jund al-Haramain reportedly overran the headquarters of other factions in the city, and killed the mother and son of an ISIL fighter by shooting at the car they were in.

On 3 January 2014, after the formation of the Army of Mujahideen rebel alliance, Liwa Jund al-Haramain joined the alliance, alongside the Nour al-Din al-Zenki Movement and Ansar al-Khilafah, a Hizb ut-Tahrir aligned group. On the same day the Army of Mujahideen declared war on ISIL with the Syrian Revolutionaries Front.

In March 2016, the group joined the Syrian Democratic Forces.

In August 2017, Ibrahim al-Banawi the commander of Liwa Jund al-Haramain defected to the Syrian Army after meeting with Suheil al-Hassan of the Syrian Army's Tiger Forces.

References

Military units and factions of the Syrian civil war
2012 establishments in Syria